Glossotrophia gracilis is a moth of the family Geometridae. It is found in Iran, the United Arab Emirates and Oman.

References

Moths described in 1941
Moths of Asia